The Kenyon Peaks are a small group of basalt peaks  northwest of Storm Peak, in the Marshall Mountains of Antarctica. They were named by the Ohio State University party to the Queen Alexandra Range (1966–67) for D. Kenyon King, a field assistant with the party.

References

Mountains of the Ross Dependency
Shackleton Coast